Astrid Kannel (born 7 June 1967 in Haapsalu) is an Estonian television journalist.

References

Estonian journalists
Estonian women journalists
Living people
1967 births
Television journalists
People from Haapsalu